Geschwenda is a village and a former municipality in the district Ilm-Kreis, in Thuringia, Germany. Since 1 January 2019, it is part of the municipality Geratal. The Olympian Bruno Bartholome was born here.

References

Former municipalities in Thuringia
Ilm-Kreis
Schwarzburg-Sondershausen